Collingwood, meaning "wood of disputed ownership", may refer to:

Educational institutions 
 Collingwood College, Victoria, an Australian state Prep to Year 12 school
 Collingwood College, Durham, college of Durham University, England
 Collingwood College, Surrey, state secondary comprehensive technology college in Camberley, England
 Collingwood School, university-preparatory school in West Vancouver, British Columbia, Canada

Places

Australia
 Collingwood, Queensland, a ghost town west of Winton on the Western River
 Collingwood, Victoria, an inner suburb of Melbourne
 City of Collingwood, a former local government area in Victoria, Australia
 Collingwood, Liverpool, a museum in Sydney

Canada
 Collingwood, Calgary, a neighbourhood in Calgary, Alberta
 Collingwood, Vancouver, a neighbourhood in southeast Vancouver, British Columbia
 Collingwood, Nova Scotia
 Collingwood, Ontario

New Zealand
 Collingwood, New Zealand
 Collingwood (New Zealand electorate)

United States

Collingwood, New York, a place in New York

Ships
 HMS Collingwood, a list of ships that have used the name within the Royal Navy
 HMCS Collingwood, a Flower-class corvette that served with the Royal Canadian Navy launched in 1940

Sports teams 
 Collingwood Football Club, of the Australian Football League
 Collingwood Magpies Netball, of the National Netball League
 Collingwood VFL Football Club, of the Victorian Football League
 Collingwood Warriors S.C., of the National Soccer League

Other uses
 Collingwood (surname), a list of people with the surname
 Collingwood (mansion), a historic mansion in Fort Hunt, Virginia
 Collingwood & Co., TV animation studio based in London
 Collingwood, a British Rail Class 50 locomotive
 Collingwood, a housing estate in Cramlington, England
 Collingwood Monument, a monument in Tynemouth, England, dedicated to Vice Admiral Lord Cuthbert Collingwood, a Napoleonic-era British admiral

See also
 Collingwood Corner, Nova Scotia
 Collingwood station (disambiguation)
 Collinwood (disambiguation)